The 2015 UMass Minutemen football team represented the University of Massachusetts Amherst in the 2015 NCAA Division I FBS football season. This was their second year with head coach Mark Whipple. The Minutemen divided their home schedule between two stadiums. Three home games were played at Gillette Stadium in Foxborough, Massachusetts and the other three games were played on the UMass campus at Warren McGuirk Alumni Stadium. This season was UMass's fourth and last in the Mid-American Conference within the East Division. They finished the season 3–9, 2–6 in MAC play to finish in a three way tie for fifth place in the East Division.

Schedule

Schedule Source:

Game summaries

Colorado

Temple

Notre Dame

FIU

Bowling Green

Kent State

Toledo

Ball State

Akron

Eastern Michigan

Miami (OH)

Buffalo

References

UMass
UMass Minutemen football seasons
UMass Minutemen football